Bharti Patel is an English actress, known for portraying the role of Ruhma Carter on the BBC soap opera Doctors. For her portrayal of Ruhma, she has been nominated for numerous awards at the National Television Awards, British Soap Awards and Inside Soap Awards.

Career
Patel made her professional acting debut as a shop assistant in an episode of the BBC drama series Screenplay. In 2003, she appeared as a dancer in the feature film What a Girl Wants. In 2012, she portrayed the roles of Ursula and Verges in a production of Much Ado About Nothing at the World Shakespeare Festival. In 2015, Bharti began portraying the role of Ruhma Carter in the BBC soap opera Doctors. The next year, she was nominated for Best Newcomer at the British Soap Awards. In 2018, she appeared in an episode of the Hulu series Find Me in Paris as Mama Khan, and in 2019, she portrayed the role of Manju in the BBC Two sitcom Don't Forget the Driver.

Filmography

Awards and nominations

References

External links
 

20th-century English actresses
21st-century English actresses
Actresses from Coventry
English film actresses
English soap opera actresses
English stage actresses
English television actresses
Living people
Year of birth missing (living people)